Women's handball at the 1994 Asian Games was held in Higashiku Sports Center, Hiroshima from October 5 to October 13, 1994.

Results
All times are Japan Standard Time (UTC+09:00)

Final standing

References

Results

External links
Official website

Women